Ben Gorm is a 700 m high mountain in southwest County Mayo, Ireland, on the northern shore of Killary Harbour.

See also

Lists of mountains in Ireland
Lists of mountains and hills in the British Isles
List of P600 mountains in the British Isles
List of Marilyns in the British Isles
List of Hewitt mountains in England, Wales and Ireland

References 

Mountains and hills of County Mayo
Mountains under 1000 metres
Marilyns of Ireland